The Wda is a river in Poland; it has a lowland character. The Wda is one of the 15 main canoe trails in Poland. It is 198 km long and the surface of its catchment area amounts to 2325 km2. The Wda's average gradient is 0.7‰ and its flow is 6.52 m3/s.

The Wda begins its course at Krążno Lake and ends in the Wisła in Świecie. The Wda is one of the longest rivers in Bory Tucholskie and one of the most important of Pomorze's river routes.

Geography
The source of Wda is on Równina Charzykowska in Krężno Lake. The river flows through the area of Bory Tucholskie, Wdzydzki Landscape Park and Wdecki Landscape Park.

There is one river's canal below Wdzydze Lake. The river reaches Tleń, then flows across Wysoczyzna Świecka and ends in Wisła in Świecie on Dolina Fordońska.

Lakes
Krężno
Wieckie
Lubiszewskie
Schodno
Radolne
Wdzydze
Żurskie
The Wdzydze Lake along with lakes Gołyń, Jeleń and Słupinek are called Morze Kaszubskie. This lakes take a shape of the cross made of postglacial channels. Wdzydze Lake is dangerous for inexperienced canoeists during strong winds.

Towns
Lipusz
Borsk
Wojtal
Czarna Woda
Wda
Błędno
Tleń
Żur
Świecie

Flora and fauna
Wda runs through many multispecies deciduous forests, in which contains diverse lichens. The river meanders also through riparian forests and alder forests. Rare mountain ash brekinii can be found in the Zygmunt Czubiński Reserve “Brzęki” in Szczerkowo. Next rare and protected plants on Wda's route are: lycopodium clavatum, diphasiastrum complanatum, lycopodium annotinum, sundew, western marsh orchid, heath spotted orchid, lesser butterfly-orchid, broad-leaved helleborine, european common twayblade and arctostaphylos uva-ursi, which are found in Wdecki Landscape Park.
This region of Poland houses species like: cranes, common goldeneyes, goosanders, western marsh harriers, ruffs, kingfishers, trouts, common vipers, fire salamanders, tree frogs and great crested newts.

History
The name “Wda” has been already used in the Middle Ages, but the river is also known as Czarna Woda. This name comes from dark brown colour of water caused by marshy banks, mineral molecules in water and sludge from tar factories in the 19th century.
After World War I tourism started developing on Wda and about 40 years later Wda earned its title of The Queen of The Rivers of Kociew and The Beauty of The Land of Kociew.

Hydroelectric power stations
On the Wda's route are three hydroelectric power stations located in Żur, Gródek and Kozłowo. In this area canoeists need to portage their canoes to the further part of the river.

Attractions
Along the route of Wda some attractions can be found. First of them is a 19th-century Neogothic church in Lipusz. Next Kaszubski Park Etnograficzny, containing wooden dwelling houses, farms and windmills. The oldest once date back to the 17th century.
The archeological reserve “Kamienne Kręgi” near the towns of Odry and Miedzno consists of 12 mysterious stone circles and 20 burial mounds, which are remains from Goths and Gepids.
Błędno has a memorial for the victory of Polish and Soviet guerrilla fighters over the German army (27 X 1944).
Next monument on Wda's route is a castle of the Teutonic Knights in Świecie. This is a building surrounded by water. From two sides by Wda and Wisła, and from the third side by the moat. There are also remains of defensive walls in the Old Town of Świecie and monumental Gothic parish church.

See also
Rivers of Poland

References

Sources
 http://visitkujawsko-pomorskie.pl/rzeka-wda,178,2,1109.html
 http://www.splywy.pl/wda/wda_dok.htm
 Galiński Z., Przewodnik dla kajakarzy. Wda, Pascal, 2003.

Rivers of Poland
Rivers of Kuyavian-Pomeranian Voivodeship
Rivers of Pomeranian Voivodeship